Matthew Marshall Dunbar (born October 15, 1968) is an American former Major League Baseball (MLB) pitcher who played for the Florida Marlins in 1995.

Biography
A native of Tallahassee, Florida, Dunbar attended Dunedin High School and Florida State University. In 1989, he played collegiate summer baseball with the Chatham A's of the Cape Cod Baseball League. He was drafted by the New York Yankees in the 25th round of the 1990 amateur draft. 

Dunbar played his first professional season with the Class A (Short Season) Oneonta Yankees in 1990. He made his major league debut with the Marlins in 1995, and appeared in eight games for the team that season. His final professional season was spent with the Pittsburgh Pirates' Double-A Altoona Curve and Triple-A Nashville Sounds in 1999.

References

External links

1968 births
Living people
Albany-Colonie Yankees players
American expatriate baseball players in Canada
American expatriate baseball players in Mexico
Altoona Curve players
Baseball players from Tallahassee, Florida
Chatham Anglers players
Columbus Clippers players
Edmonton Trappers players
Florida Marlins players
Florida State Seminoles baseball players
Greensboro Bats players
Greensboro Hornets players
Guerreros de Oaxaca players
Gulf Coast Yankees players
Huntsville Stars players
Louisville Redbirds players
Major League Baseball pitchers
Mexican League baseball pitchers
Nashville Sounds players
Norwich Navigators players
Oneonta Yankees players
Prince William Cannons players
Vancouver Canadians players